Ten Ten-Vilu or Trentren-Vilu (from Mapudungun Trengtrengfilu: Trengtreng a name, and filu "snake") is the Mapuche god of Earth and Fertility (or goddess in some versions found in Chiloé); he has a generous spirit and is the protector of all life on Earth, and the flora and fauna and according to some Mapuche myths (later also found in Chiloé). This snake was a central figure in the Origin Of The Chiloean Archipelago. In Mapuche mythology, Ten Ten-Vilu is son of Antü (a Pillan spirit).

 'Origin of Ten-Ten vilu' : The legend tells that the son, or daughter (in other versions), of the spirit Pillan Antu, wanted anvisibly the power of his father, as punishment his father transformed him into a serpent, which would become the divinity of all that is the earth.
Ten-ten vilu, along with Kai-Kai vilu were children of Antu and Pien-Pillan (Antu, father of Ten-ten, and Pien-Pillan father of Kai-Kai) powerful spirits plunder, but they ambitious of the power of their parents They tried to obtain their power, in punishment their parents transformed them into serpents, into Kai-Kai vilu "the serpent goddess of the sea" and Ten-ten vilu "the serpent goddess of the earth".
 'The fight of Kai-Ki vilu versus Ten-Ten vilu' : In such a way that later the humans did not capture what the spirits gave them, then the serpent (God / Goddess) of the sea and evil spirit were I come, eliminating them by raising the waters to drown and assassinate them, but Ten-Ten vilu raised the earth and began a titanic war, when both were left (in effect of the elevation of the sea and the mountains) the archipelago of Chiloe. That is why now when Kai-Kai Vilu is going to raise the water, Ten-Ten had us moving the ground under our feet (this last narrative explains why Earthquakes occur and, indeed, tsunamis).

See also 
Chilota mythology
Mapuche mythology
Coi Coi-Vilu

References
 Alberto Trivero (1999), Trentrenfilú, (in Spanish). Proyecto de Documentación Ñuke Mapu.
 Martinez Vilches, Oscar, Chiloe Misterioso (in Spanish). Pub. Ediciones de la Voz de Chiloe (circa 1998)

Mapuche deities
Chilote deities
Legendary serpents
Earth deities
Fertility deities
Volcano deities
Snake deities

es:Trentren Vilu y Caicai Vilu